Humboldt Cave is an archeological site in Churchill County, Nevada. Thirty-one caches were excavated from the cave, but there is only one radiocarbon date of 1953±175 14C BP (~2000 years ago) from the cave, which suggests that Humboldt Cave may have only been a single cultural component. In other words, the caches from the cave may have only been deposited once and at the same time.

Description
Humboldt Cave is a dry cave which was first excavated by archeologists in 1936. The cave's environment preserved artifacts including fiber and skin garments, bags and mats. Other artifacts found in the cave have documented contact with cultures in what were in what is now Arizona and California. The cave was formed by vertical faulting in a cliff face, which was periodically flooded by Lake Lahontan. The flooding deposited tufa over the cave's surfaces, preserving them from erosion.

Excavation
Humboldt Cave was excavated in 1936 by Robert F. Heizer of the University of California, Berkeley. The Archaeology of Humboldt Cave, Churchill County, Nevada was not published until 1956. Heizer concluded that the remote location relative to the lake and marshes made Humboldt Cave a temporary refuge rather than a permanent residence.

Initial stages of excavation concentrated on improving access by widening the cave's opening. Sections were excavated in  increments. Apart from fur, feather, bone, wood and horn that had been damaged by insects and rodents, artifacts were recovered in near-perfect condition. No significant evidence of distinct occupation levels was apparent. Heizer proposed that Humboldt Cave's occupants corresponded to those of the later or upper levels of Lovelock Cave. The cave had been occupied by pack rats, who filled any available space with gathered material, which included artifacts, particularly in a low hollowed space that the excavators called the "South Alcove." Pack rats jumbled much of the material, as was illustrated when, during excavation, a wool sweater was left in the cave. Rats shredded the sweater and took the pieces into the alcove, where parts of sweater were recovered all the way to the solid cave floor during later excavation.

Artifacts
The most significant artifacts recovered during the excavation were usually found in one of 31 cache pits dug into the cave floor by the inhabitants. The pits were lined with worn-out baskets, pieces of baskets, or grass. Cache 13 in particular, called by excavators the "shaman's cache," yielded a birdskin robe, pouches, waterfowl bones and skins, hawk feathers and a stuffed canvasback duck head.  The robe was believed to have originally been feathered, the feathers having been extensively damaged by insects while buried. Heizer speculated that the cache's contents might have been curative tokens, or could simply have been used to make decoys. A number of shaped sickles fashioned from bighorn sheep horns were also recovered.

Humboldt Cave was placed on the National Register of Historic Places on March 16, 1976. It was included due to its significance as a prehistoric archaeological site and for its importance as a training ground for students of archaeology.

References

External links

Churchill County, Nevada
Archaic period in North America
Archaeological sites on the National Register of Historic Places in Nevada
Caves of Nevada
National Register of Historic Places in Churchill County, Nevada